Duygulu can refer to:

 Duygulu, Kozluk
 Duygulu, Sivrice